Søren Louis Pilmark (born 16 October 1955) is a Danish actor. Pilmark has worked as a film and theatrical actor, a director, and as an author.

Career

Theater 
Pilmark graduated from the School of Acting at Aarhus Theater in 1977, where he was then was part of the performing company until 1980. From 1981 to 1994 he was a member of the company of the Royal Danish Theatre. Over the course of his theatrical career, Pilmark has played a variety of roles, including: Morten in Marx and Coca Cola (1981), the main role in Erasmus Montanus (1983), the Pirate King in The Pirates of Penzance (1985), the monologue of Natten før skoven (1985), The Prince in Der var engang (1987), Konstantin in The Seagull (1987), Johannes in Ordet (1991), the lead roles in Hamlet (1992) and Richard III (1994), John in Oleanna (1995), the Engineer in Miss Saigon (1996), Heisenberg in Copenhagen (1999), Speed the Plow (2002), King Philip in Don Carlos (2009), Professor Higgins in My Fair Lady (2010), and Stockmann in An Enemy of the People (2021).

With Per Pallesen he created The Pallesen Pilmark Show, which toured in both in Asia and in the United States from 1984–1998. A TV version of the show, which was broadcast on DR, won the Silver Rose at the Rose d'Or Festival in 1985. Since 1991, Pilmark has been part of the musical/comedy group Ørkenens Sønner together with Henrik Koefoed, Niels Olsen and Asger Reher. Within the group, he has played the role of 'Omar Papa', the lodge’s magical master and technical genius. The group have produced nine Ørkenens Sønner shows.

As a stage director, Pilmark worked on Dyrene i Hakkebakkeskoven (1996) and Simpatico (1997).

Film & TV 
Pilmark’s first film role was as an extra, a boy in the street, in the comedy Den kære familie in 1962, at the age of 6. Later film roles include Flickering Lights (2000) and King’s Game (2004), Roser og persille (1993), Menneskedyret (1995), Lad de små børn (2004), Lotto (2006), Kærestesorger (2009), Kon-Tiki (2012), and Downsizing (2017). He has had a recurring role in the Jussi Adler-Olsen thrillers Kvinden i buret, Fasandræberne, Flaskepost fra P, and Journal 64. In 2006 his short fiction film Helmer & Son was nominated for an Academy Award.

On TV he has had roled in Riget, Een stor familie (1982–83), De skrigende halse (1993), Gøngehøvdingen (1992), Taxa (1999), Lykke (2011-2012), 1864 (2014), Kampen om det tunge vand (2015), Atlantic Crossing (2020), as well as in the Netflix series Vikings: Valhalla (2022).

Writing 
Pilmark’s published his first novel, Varieté, in 2021. The novel is a historical drama about a magician, set in a provincial vaudeville theater in Denmark in the 1910s.

Personal life 
Pilmark was born in Hvidovre, where his father Louis Nielsen was a school superintendent. His mother Birte Nielsen was born with the surname Pilmark. He is married to Susanne Rée Pilmark (born 1961) and has three children, Louis, Anton, and Amanda.

Honours and awards 
 Knight of the Order of Dannebrog
 Robert Award for Menneskedyret
 Robert Award for his role as Werner Heisenberg in Copenhagen
 Best actor for Flickering Lights, Method Fest
 Bodil Award for Best Supporting Actor for King's Game
 Robert Award for King’s Game
 Bronze portrait in a granite tile in Frederiksberg, 2008
 Had a street named after him, Pilmarken, in Østermarie on Bornholm, 2018

References

External links

 
 Søren Pilmark
 Søren Pilmark Blå Bog
 Søren Pilmark biography

1955 births
Living people
Danish male film actors
Danish male television actors
Best Supporting Actor Bodil Award winners
Male actors from Copenhagen
Danish male voice actors
Robert Awards
Bodil Awards